Giannis Gionakis (1922 – 25 August 2002) was a Greek actor in film and theater.

Biography
Gionakis was born in Athens in 1922. He began his studies at the medical school, but was won over by acting and proceeded to study theatre at the Karolos Koun Dramatic School and the Greek Odeon. He became particularly well known for his comedic roles in films, where he was associated with portrayals of kind but dim-witted people. In 1998 he suffered a stroke and his health deteriorated considerably, leading to his death in 2002.

Filmography

References
"Who's Who 1979", p 131.

External links

Faces of Theatre: Giannis Gkionakis  a documentary from ERT

1922 births
2002 deaths
20th-century Greek male actors
Male actors from Athens